State Road 441 (SR 441) is a part of the Indiana State Road that runs through Vincennes in the US state of Indiana.  The  of SR 441 that lie within Indiana serve as a minor highway. None of the highway is listed on the National Highway System. Most of the route is an urban two-lane highway.  The highway passes through residential and commercial properties.

Route description
SR 441 begins on the south side of Vincennes at an interchange with US 41. It passes northwest, as a two-lane highway, through Vincennes where it is concurrent with Willow Street, passing through commercial properties. The road turns northeast onto Sixth Street and passes through a mix of commercial and residential properties. The route enters downtown Vincennes and turns northwest onto Vigo Street. The highway ends at the Illinois / Indiana state line on the Lincoln Memorial Bridge that crosses the Wabash River near the George Rogers Clark National Historical Park. In Illinois the road serves as an access road to Illinois Route 33.

No segment of State Road 441 in Indiana is included in the National Highway System (NHS).  The NHS is a network of highways that are identified as being most important for the economy, mobility and defense of the nation.  The highway is maintained by the Indiana Department of Transportation (INDOT) like all other state roads in the state. The department tracks the traffic volumes along all state roads as a part of its maintenance responsibilities using a metric called average annual daily traffic (AADT). This measurement is a calculation of the traffic level along a segment of roadway for any average day of the year. In 2010, INDOT figured that lowest traffic levels were 7,350 vehicles and 450 commercial vehicles used the highway daily on the Lincoln Memorial Bridge. The peak traffic volumes were 10,270 vehicles and 1,070 commercial vehicles AADT along the section of SR 441 near its southern terminus.

Major intersections

References

External links

441
Transportation in Knox County, Indiana